A540 may refer to:
 Canon PowerShot A
 Quebec Autoroute 540 (disambiguation)

See also
 Archimedes 540, abbreviated to A540 - one of the Acorn Archimedes range of RISC computers